Birmingham was a town in Kentucky that was destroyed by the creation of Kentucky Lake.

History
Birmingham was located on land owned by Thomas A. Grubbs in 1849, laid out and platted in 1853 and incorporated in 1860. Early residents included L. S. Locker, Thomas Love and Thomas C. Grubbs.  Birmingham enjoyed prosperity shortly after the end of the Civil War when a stave mill and timber business employed over 200 people.  Birmingham was named after Birmingham, England in hope that the city would establish its European namesake's iron industry; the area had its own nascent iron industry, some remains of which can be viewed today in the Land Between the Lakes.  Collins' History of Kentucky states that in 1874 Birmingham had a population of 322; by contrast, the county seat of Benton, Kentucky then had a population of only 158.  By 1894 Birmingham had five churches, two schools, two hotels, four dry goods and general stores, three grocers, two millinery shops, two wagon and blacksmith shops and a drug store.  By 1929 Birmingham still had around 600 residents.

The Tennessee Valley Authority announced the building of Kentucky Dam for the creation of Kentucky Lake in 1938, and at that time Birmingham's residents were informed that they must relocate.  The TVA commenced land purchases in 1942.  The dam was completed in 1944, and the entirety of Birmingham, Kentucky was submerged under the resulting lake, the largest manmade lake in the world at the time.  Some residents of Birmingham had to relocate a second time due to the creation of Lake Barkley.

When the water in Kentucky Lake is low, the remains of foundations and streets of Birmingham are often visible, especially at Birmingham Point.

Notable people
NBA star Joe Fulks was born in Birmingham.

References

Populated places established in 1860
Destroyed towns
Former municipalities in Kentucky
Geography of Marshall County, Kentucky
Submerged settlements in the United States
1853 establishments in Kentucky
Sundown towns in Kentucky